Trishna is a 1978 Indian Hindi film directed by Anil Ganguly. The film stars Shashi Kapoor, Sanjeev Kumar and Raakhee in lead roles. The film was a remake of Tamil film Thoondil Meen.

It was loose remade in Kannada as Avala Hejje(1981) & Telugu as Bandhalu Anubandhalu(1982).

Plot
Dr. Sunil Gupta (Sanjeev Kumar) lives a wealthy lifestyle with his wife, Aarti (Raakhee). After several years of marriage the couple still struggle to bring a child to the world. Aarti decides to take a break and visits their Khandala bungalow, which is near her sister Vidya's (Bindu) house, where she lives with her husband (Sujit Kumar) and their son Raju. Aarti's bungalow is being decorated by Vinod (Shashi Kapoor), who was hired by Vidya and whom she remembers as a fellow from college, both spend considerable time together. Knowing that Aarti is basically alone, Vinod tries to pursue her. After an intense scuffle, Aarti accidentally kills him. Vidya assists Aarti in disposing of his body. However, a few days later, Sunil comes to Khandala and brings home a man who claims that he has lost his memory. The man is none other than Vinod - and Sunil's diagnosis indicates a gradual recovery for Vinod at the end of which he will regain his memory. The story deepens as Vidya and Aarti try to prevent this from happening.

Cast
 Shashi Kapoor - Vinod Sinha
 Sanjeev Kumar - Dr. Sunil Gupta
 Raakhee - Mrs. Aarti Gupta
 Bindu - Vidya
 Sujit Kumar - Retd Army Major
 Dinesh Hingoo - Bahadur
 Preeti Ganguli - Rosie

Awards
Nominated, Filmfare Best Actress Award - Raakhee

Music

References

External links

1978 films
1970s Hindi-language films
Films scored by Kalyanji Anandji
Films directed by Anil Ganguly
Hindi remakes of Tamil films